The Order of the Solar Temple (OTS) and the  International Chivalric Organization of the Solar Tradition, or simply The Solar Temple, is a cult and religious sect that claims to be based upon the ideals of the Knights Templar. OTS was founded by Joseph di Mambro and Luc Jouret in 1984 in Geneva, as l'Ordre International Chevaleresque de Tradition Solaire (OICTS), and later it was renamed Ordre du Temple Solaire. It is associated with a series of murders and mass suicides that claimed several dozen lives in France, Switzerland, and Canada in 1994 and 1995.

Some historians allege that the Solar Temple was founded by the French author Jacques Breyer, who established a Sovereign Order of the Solar Temple in 1952. In 1968, a schismatic order was renamed the Renewed Order of the Solar Temple (ROTS) under the leadership of the French right-wing political activist Julien Origas.

Beliefs 
According to "Peronnik" (a pseudonym of temple member Robert Chabrier) in his book, "Pourquoi la Résurgence de l'Ordre du Temple? Tome Premier: Le Corps" ("Why a Revival of the Order of the Solar Temple? Vol. One: The Body") 1975, pp. 147–149, the aims of the Order of the Solar Temple included: establishing "correct notions of authority and power in the world"; an affirmation of the primacy of the spiritual over the temporal; assisting humanity through a great "transition"; preparing for the Second Coming of Christ as a solar god-king; and furthering a unification of all Christian churches and Islam. The group reportedly drew some inspiration for its teachings from British occultist Aleister Crowley, who headed the Ordo Templi Orientis from 1923 until his death in 1947, and the Hermetic Order of the Golden Dawn, a 19th-century Rosicrucian Order Crowley belonged to briefly. Both occult groups had a grade system somewhat similar to the Solar Temple. 
There were Solar Temple lodges in Morin Heights and Sainte-Anne-de-la-Pérade, Quebec, Canada, as well as in Australia, Switzerland, Martinique and other countries. The Temple's activities were a mix of early Christian Identity, UFO religion and New Age philosophy using variously adapted Freemason rituals. Jouret was interested in attractive, wealthy and influential members, and it was reputed that several affluent Europeans were secret members of the group.

Structure 
According to the literature of the OTS, the central authority was the Synarchy of the Temple, whose membership was secret. Its top 33 members were known as the Elder Brothers of the Rosy Cross (an alternative name for the Rosicrucians), and were headquartered in Zürich, Switzerland. The Council of the Order formed Lodges that were run by a Regional Commander and three Elders.  Progression in the Order was by levels and grades, with three grades per level — the levels being The Brothers of Parvis, The Knights of the Alliance and the Brothers of the Ancient Times, in ascending order.  There were many organizations associated with the OTS, including the International Archedia Sciences and Tradition, Archedia Clubs, Menta Clubs, Agata Clubs and Atlanta Clubs, all of which offered the teachings of Luc Jouret both to the general public and privately to OTS members. The Lodges had altars, rituals and costumes. Members were initiated at each stage of advancement in ceremonies which included expensive purchases, jewellery, costumes, regalia, and the payment of initiation fees. During ceremonies, members wore Crusader-type robes and were to hold in awe a sword, which Di Mambro said was an authentic Templar artifact, given to him a thousand years ago in a previous life.

Mass murders and suicides 

In October 1994, Tony Dutoit's infant son (Emmanuel Dutoit), aged three months, was killed at the group's centre in Morin-Heights, Quebec. The baby had been stabbed repeatedly with a wooden stake. It is believed that Di Mambro ordered the murder, because he identified the baby as the Antichrist described in the Bible. He believed that the Antichrist was born into the order to prevent Di Mambro from succeeding in his spiritual aim.

Some time afterwards, Di Mambro and twelve followers performed a ritual Last Supper. Subsequently, apparent mass suicides and murders were conducted at Cheiry and Salvan, two villages in Western Switzerland, and at Morin Heights—15 inner circle members committed suicide with poison, 30 were killed by bullets or smothering, and eight others were killed by other means. In Switzerland, many of the victims were found in a secret underground chapel lined with mirrors and other items of Templar symbolism. The bodies were dressed in the order's ceremonial robes and were in a circle, feet together, heads outward, most with plastic bags tied over their heads; they had each been shot in the head. The plastic bags may have been a symbol of the ecological disaster that would befall the human race after the OTS members moved on to Sirius; it's also possible that these bags were used as part of the OTS rituals, and that members would have voluntarily worn them without being placed under duress. There was also evidence that many of the victims in Switzerland were drugged before they were shot. Other victims were found in three ski chalets; several dead children were lying together. The tragedy was discovered when officers rushed to the sites to fight the fires that had been ignited by remote-control devices. Farewell letters left by the believers stated that they believed they were leaving to escape the "hypocrisies and oppression of this world."

A mayor, a journalist, a civil servant, and a sales manager were found among the dead in Switzerland. Records seized by the Quebec police showed that some members had personally donated over C$1 million to Di Mambro. Another attempted mass suicide of the remaining members was thwarted in the late 1990s. All the suicide/murders and attempts occurred around the dates of the equinoxes and solstices in some relation to the beliefs of the group.

Another mass-death incident related to the OTS took place during the night between the 15 and 16 December 1995. On 23 December 1995, 16 bodies were discovered in a star-formation in the Vercors mountains of France. It was found later that two of them shot the others and then committed suicide by firearm and immolation. One of the dead included Olympian Edith Bonlieu, who had competed in the women's downhill at the 1956 Winter Olympics.

On the morning of 23 March 1997, five members of the OTS took their own lives in Saint-Casimir, Quebec. A small house erupted in flames, leaving behind five charred bodies for the police to pull from the rubble. Three teenagers, aged 13, 14 and 16, the children of one of the couples that died in the fire, were discovered in a shed behind the house, alive but heavily drugged.

Michel Tabachnik, an internationally renowned Swiss musician and conductor, was arrested as a leader of the Solar Temple in the late 1990s.  He was indicted for "participation in a criminal organization" and murder.  He came to trial in Grenoble, France, during the spring of 2001 and was acquitted. French prosecutors appealed against the verdict and an appellate court ordered a second trial beginning 24 October 2006. He was again cleared less than two months later in December 2006.

Spanish sect 
The Order of the Solar Temple was also based in Spain, especially in the Canary Islands. In 1984, the founder of the OTS, Luc Jouret, lectured on the island of Tenerife. The leader of the order's branch in Spain lived on the south of the island. The only Spaniard who died in the suicide of the Order of the Solar Temple was a barber from Tenerife. In 1998, a sect was suspected of plotting ritual suicide in the Teide National Park. Both Spanish and German police initially linked the group to the Order of the Solar Temple.

See also 

 Secret society

References 

Sources
Daraul, Arkon. A History of Secret Societies.  (NY: Citadel, 1995)
Galanter, Marc. Cults: Faith, Healing, and Coercion. (New York: Oxford University Press, 1989)
Moran, Sarah. The Secret World of Cults.  (Surrey, England: CLB International, 1999)
Davis, Eric. Solar Temple Pilots, The Village Voice (25 October 1994)
"French Magistrate rejects idea that outsiders killed cultists," AFP, (24 April 2001)
Haight, James A. And Now, the Solar Temple. Free Inquiry, Winter 1994–95.
Hassan-Gordon, Tariq. Solar Temple Cult Influenced by Ancient Egypt, (Middle East Times, Issue 18, 2001)
Mayer, Jean-François.  Apocalyptic Millennialism in the West: The Case of the Solar Temple, Critical Incident Analysis Group, hsc.Virginia.edu, retrieved, 4 January 2003.
Musician Denies Solar Temple Murders, The Scotsman, Edinburgh (18 April 2001)
Palmer, Susan. Purity and Danger in the Solar Temple, Journal of Contemporary Religion 3 (October 1996) pages 303–318
Probert, Robert. Solar Temple: Tabachnik Acquitted, Center for New Religious Studies, (25 June 2001)
Serrill, Michael S. Remains of the day, Time, (24 October 1994)
Spanish cops arrest cult leader, Associated Press, (8 January 1998)

Further reading 
 James R. Lewis (editor), The Order of the Solar Temple: The Temple of Death (Ashgate Publishing Company, Ashgate Controversial New Religions Series, 2006).

External links 
Religious Tolerance: Solar Temple
CBC Digital Archives – Solar Temple: A cult gone wrong
Order of the Solar Temple – Britannica

 
Secret societies in France
Secret societies in Canada
Cults
Mass suicides
Suicides in Switzerland
Deaths by stabbing in Canada
1994 murders in Canada
1994 in Switzerland
Knights Templar in popular culture
1994 in Quebec
Crime in Quebec